Walter Hendley may refer to:

Walter Hendley of the Hendley Baronets
Walter Hendley (MP), MP for Canterbury